is an original Japanese anime television series created by Norihiro Naganuma, animated by Wit Studio and produced by Shogakukan-Shueisha Productions. It is directed by Masahiko Ohta and written by Takashi Aoshima, with Yasuhiro Misawa composing the music. It aired from April to July 2022 on TV Tokyo's children's variety program Oha Suta.

Characters

Production and release
The original anime television series created by Norihiro Naganuma and produced by Shogakukan-Shueisha Productions was announced on February 3, 2022, which comes from AAO Project, a joint initiative by AOI Pro., Amuse, and Origamix Partners to develop and produce original intellectual property. Masahiko Ohta is directing the anime at Wit Studio, with Jun'ichirō Hashiguchi serving as assistant director, Takashi Aoshima writing the scripts, and Yasuhiro Misawa composing the music. Original onikko designs are provided by Tomari, while Ryuuta Yanagi designs the characters. The series aired from April 11 to July 1, 2022 on TV Tokyo's children's variety program Oha Suta. The first theme song is "Onipapapan! Pan!". The second theme song is "Oni Yaba—!". Both theme songs were performed by Onipan's! (Yume Nozaki, Mika Negishi, and Kokona Nonaka). Sentai Filmworks has licensed the series outside of Asia.

Episode list

See also
 My Friend's Little Sister Has It In for Me! and Spy Classroom, light novel series illustrated by original onikko designer, Tomari

Notes

References

External links
 Anime official website 
 

Anime with original screenplays
Demons in anime and manga
Demons in television
Sentai Filmworks
Wit Studio